Virginie was a 40-gun  frigate of the French Navy, lead ship of its class.

Career

French service 
She took part in the First Battle of Groix and in the Battle of Groix.

Virginie retreated and the British squadron gave chase, joining with the French frigate around 23:00. Indefatigable closed in and exchanged broadsides, without succeeding in her attempts at raking Virginie. The gunnery exchange lasted for 4 hours, until the British frigates caught up. Bergeret then struck his colours in the face of an overwhelming opponent.

She was subsequently recommissioned in the Royal Navy as HMS Virginie.

British service 
In January 1799, Virginie was with British squadron at the defence of Macau during the Macau Incident.

On 20 May 1808, she captured the Dutch frigate Guelderland.

In Royal Navy service the armament consisted of 46 guns:
 8 carronades (32-pounders) on the quarterdeck and forecastle
 28 long ordnances (18-pounders) on the main deck
 10 long ordnances (9-pounders) on the quarterdeck and forecastle

Notes, citations, and references
Notes

Citations

References
 Grocott, Terence (1997) Shipwrecks of the revolutionary & Napoleonic eras (Chatham). 

 Naval Database 
 Lines of Virginie at the National Maritime Museum

External links
 

Virginie-class frigates
Ships built in France
1794 ships